Emily Kunstler (born June 24, 1978) is an American documentary filmmaker. Kunstler grew up in New York City's West Village neighborhood.

Family 
Kunstler is the daughter of lawyer William Kunstler and is the sister of attorney Sarah Kunstler. Her mother is Margaret Ratner Kunstler, who is a prominent New York human rights attorney.

Off Center Media 
In 1999, Kunstler co-founded Off Center Media with Sarah Kunstler. Off Center is a documentary production company that claimed to expose injustice in the criminal justice system through the creation and circulation of media.

Kunstler completed a celebratory documentary about her father entitled William Kunstler: Disturbing the Universe that screened at the Sundance Film Festival in 2009. The film was a co-production of the Independent Television Service (ITVS) and aired on the PBS series P.O.V.. In 2009, the film was nominated for the Documentary Grand Jury Prize at the Sundance Film Festival. In 2010, the film was among 15 films shortlisted for an Academy Award for Best Documentary Feature for the 83rd Academy Awards. Her film Tulia, Texas: Scenes from the Drug War won Best Short Documentary at the Woodstock Film Festival (2002) and her film Getting Through to the President won the Jury Prize at the Black Maria Film Festival and the Audience Choice Award at the Portland International Short Short Film Festival (2004).

In 2021 Kunstler completed Who We Are: A Chronicle of Racism in America, which premiered at SXSW in 2021 and won the Audience Award in the Documentary Spotlight Category. The film was acquired by Sony Pictures Classics and theatrically released January 14, 2022.

References

External links 
 Off Center Media Page
 
 
 Who We Are: A Chronicle of Racism in America page 
 Disturbing The Universe POV Page
 Disturbing The Universe ITVS Page

Living people
American documentary filmmakers
20th-century American Jews
Place of birth missing (living people)
Vassar College alumni
Tisch School of the Arts alumni
1978 births
American women documentary filmmakers
Activists from New York City
Filmmakers from New York (state)
21st-century American Jews